Forestry Science and Technology Institute is a Bangladesh government owned forestry educational institute in Chittagong. It is the only institute in Bangladesh that offers a four-year diploma in forestry.

History 
Forestry Science and Technology Institute was established in 1994 in Chittagong with financial support from World Bank and United Nations Development Programme. It was originally called Bangladesh Forest College. it is under the Bangladesh Technical Education Board and run by Bangladesh Forest Department. It is a residential institute. The institute had 10 teachers at the beginning but the number was reduced to three after funding shortages. The institute takes in 50 students per year.

On 13 March 2020, a video was leaked showing two teachers of the institute demanding money from students for good grades. One teacher, Amal Krisno Mandal, said that the student would be held back one year if he did not pay the money demanded. The other teacher was Delwar Hossain who allegedly prevented the installations of CCTV cameras in exam halls.

On 13 August 2020, a 14th batch student of the college, Yosuf Ali, was killed while serving in the Forest Department. He was killed while trying prevent illegal land grabbing and logging.

There are two other forestry institutes in Bangladesh, Forestry Science and Technology Institute, Rajshahi and Forestry Science and Technology Institute, Sylhet.

References 

1994 establishments in Bangladesh
Organisations based in Chittagong
Research institutes in Bangladesh
Forest research institutes